HMRI may refer to:

His Majesty's Railway Inspectorate, in the UK
Housing Market Renewal Initiative, in the UK
Huntington Medical Research Institutes, in Pasadena, California
Hunter Medical Research Institutem in Newcastle, New South Wales